Tenna (Téna in local dialect) is a comune (municipality) in Trentino in the northern Italian region Trentino-Alto Adige/Südtirol, located about  southeast of Trento.

Tenna borders the following municipalities: Pergine Valsugana, Levico Terme and Caldonazzo.

Demographic evolution

References

External links
 Homepage of the city
 Pictures and information about Tenna (Italy)

Cities and towns in Trentino-Alto Adige/Südtirol